Mangalmé is a department of Guéra Region in Chad.   Its chief town is Mangalmé.

Mangalmé Department has a population of 156,910 (2016 survey) and 212 villages.

The majority of the population in Mangalmé is ethnic Mubi.

Subdivisions 
The department of Mangalmé is divided into 4 sub-prefectures:

 Mangalmé
 Bitchotchi
 Eref
 Kouka Margni

Administration 
Prefects of Mangalmé (since 2008)

 October 9, 2008: Mahamat Habib Taha

References 

Departments of Chad